Marcel Gerhard (born 25 August 1955) is a Swiss former speedway rider.

Career
Gerhard competed in speedway, Longtrack and Grasstrack racing. He reached twelve World Longtrack world championship finals and took the top honours in 1992.

In 1997, he won the Argentine Championship.

World Longtrack Championship

Finals
 1982  Esbjerg (12th) 6pts
 1983  Marianske Lazne (16th) 3pts
 1984  Herxheim (9th) 9pts
 1985  Esbjerg (19th) 0pts
 1986  Herxheim (Third) 18pts
 1989  Marianske Lazne (9th) 17pts
 1990  Herxheim (4th) 28pts
 1991  Marianske Lazne (4th) 18pts
 1992  Pfarrkirchen (Champion) 23pts
 1993  Mühldorf (Third) 16pts, after run-off
 1994  Marianske Lazne (7th) 11pts
 1996  Herxheim (4th) 18pts

Semi-finals
 1987  Marianske Lazne (15th) 3pts
 1988  Jubeck (11th) 12pts
 1995  Harsewinkel (Did not start)

References

 http://grasstrackgb.co.uk/marcel-gerhard/
 http://grasstrackgb.co.uk/world-longtrack-1992-final/
 http://www.gerhard-engines.com/about/
 http://www.speedwaygp.com/news/article/4794/gtr-for-jd
 http://www.speedwaygp.com/news/article/4899/gtr-powered-freddie-on-form
 https://www.speedwaygb.co/news.php?extend.31692
 https://translate.google.co.uk/translate?hl=en&sl=de&u=http://gerhard-racing.com/index.php/marcel-gerhard&prev=search

1955 births
Living people
Swiss motorcycle racers
Individual Speedway Long Track World Championship riders
Sportspeople from Thurgau